The Teru Malleshvara Hindu temple (also spelt Teru Malleshwara) is a Vijayanagara era temple in Hiriyur town near the historically important Chitradurga city in the Indian state of Karnataka. Hiriyur is situated on the right bank of the Vedavati river. The "Teru Malleshvara" fair (Jatra, a religious gathering with festivities) is celebrated annually for a week starting from the full moon in January or February (called magha). The Teru Malleshvara temple is a protected monument under the Karnataka state division of the Archaeological Survey of India

Architecture
The temple exhibits the Dravidian style of architecture with a tall gopura (superstructure over entrance gate). The ceiling of the mukhmantapa (entrance hall) has murals depicting scenes from the "Shivpurana" (Hindu Shaiva epics) and the Ramayana (the Hindu Vaishnava epic). The temple dates built around c.1466, during rule of the Vijayanagara empire.

Gallery

Notes

Hindu temples in Chitradurga district
Vijayanagara Empire
Shiva temples in Karnataka